The following is a list of disasters in Indonesia that have had widespread effects or received substantial attention. It is split into natural and manmade disasters, which includes deliberate actions, and is further sorted by date.

Natural disasters

On April 10, 1815, Mount Tambora erupts, killing 12,000
On February 16, 1861 a major earthquake struck Sumatra, killing thousands.

During August 26–27, 1883 the Krakatoa volcano erupted leading to at least 36,000 deaths. The after effects included a tsunami.

On February 2, 1938 a very large earthquake followed by a tsunami in the Banda Sea caused widespread damage but no fatalities.

In 1997 a series of forest fires broke out, causing a haze in much of Asia and worldwide environmental damage.

On December 26, 2004 a massive earthquake followed by a tsunami affected fourteen nations with Indonesia worst affected. The tsunami killed a total of approximately 230,000 people.

A major earthquake in Yogyakarta on May 27, 2006 killed 5,716 people.

A magnitude 7.7 earthquake caused a tsunami around west and central Java on July 17, 2006 and killed 668 people.

The 2010 Mentawai earthquake and tsunami occurred on October 25, 2010, severely damaging Western Sumatra and the Mentawai islands, killing 408 people and leaving 303 missing. 

On November 29, 2017 Cyclone Cempaka struck southern Java and killed at least nineteen.

In early February 2018 floods across Jakarta affected 11,450 people, with over 6,000 evacuated.

On February 21, 2018 a landslide in Pasirpanjang, Brebes, Central Java killed eighteen people.

On September 28, 2018 a magnitude 7.5 earthquake followed by a tsunami struck Sulawesi and led to the deaths of at least 4,340 people and injured about 10,679 with about 667 missing. 

On December 22, 2018 an eruption of the Anak Krakatau volcano and underwater landslides caused the 2018 Sunda Strait tsunami. It led to the deaths of at least 437 people and injured more than 14095.

On 4 December 2021, Semeru erupted for a second time in the year – the first having been in January 2021. Semeru erupted a third time on 6 December 2021.

Manmade disasters
Mass killings in 1965-6, ruled by the International Criminal Court to constitute a genocide that Indonesia was responsible for and the United Kingdom, the United States, and Australia were complicit in, killed at least 400,000 and up to three million. The killings targeted alleged communists.

On April 22, 1974 Pan Am Flight 812, a Boeing 707, crashed into a mountainside near Denpasar, Bali. killing all 107 on board.

On March 31, 1981 authorities stormed Garuda Indonesia Flight 206 in Bangkok, Thailand killing five of the Islamic terrorists who had hijacked the domestic flight over Indonesia.

In May 1998 race riots broke out throughout the country, resulting in largescale fatalities and over 150 reported rapes.

On October 13, 2002 the Bali nightclub bombings killed at least 182 most of whom were foreign tourists.

On September 9, 2004 a bombing at the Australian embassy killed ten people.

On December 30, 2006 passenger liner MV Senopati Nusantara sank in the Java Sea near Mandalika Island, with hundreds believed to have drowned.

On January 1, 2007 Adam Air Flight 574, a Boeing 737, crashed into the Makassar Strait off the coast of Sulawesi, leaving all 102 occupants missing and presumed dead.

On March 7, 2007 Garuda Indonesia Flight 200, a Boeing 737, overshot the runway at Adisucipto International Airport and killed 21 people on board.

On November 26, 2011 the Kutai Kartanegara Bridge in Borneo collapsed, resulting in 39 deaths.

In 2015 a string of forest fires caused widespread toxic haze, and were described by the Meteorology, Climatology and Geophysics Agency as a "crime against humanity".

On April 1, 2018 an oil pipeline owned by state firm Pertamina burst in Balikpapan Bay, Borneo. The oil subsequently ignited leaving several fishermen dead.

In April 2018 tainted alcohol was discovered in Jakarta and West Java, which was mixed with caffeinated energy drinks and herbal drinks, and suspected to contain mosquito repellent. At least 82 died, with others hospitalised.

References

 
 Disasters